Okoboji High School is a rural public high school in Milford, Iowa. It is the primary senior high school in the Okoboji Community School District. Their mascot is Pioneer Pete. 

The school district serves Milford, Arnolds Park, most of Fostoria, most of Okoboji, Wahpeton, and West Okoboji.

Curriculum
Courses for dual high school and college credit are available for free to students through Iowa Lakes Community College.

Extracurricular activities

Athletics
Okoboji High School is a member of the Siouxland Conference.  The Pioneers field teams in baseball, basketball, cross country, football, golf, softball, track, volleyball, and wrestling. It shares sports teams in soccer, tennis, and swimming.

State Championships
1973 Boys Class C Cross Country (as Milford)

Clubs and performance groups

Okoboji's performing arts have several award-winning programs. Most notably is the jazz band, which has qualified for state the last 23 years. Winning the state championship in 1999, 2000, 2010, 2011, 2018, and 2019.

Okoboji's debate program won the Sweepstakes trophy in 2007 and has had multiple state champions and national qualifiers.

Okoboji's speech program has had numerous all-state selections and won the all-state banner for improvisational acting in 1995.

Other activities and clubs include:

All School Play
Art Society
Cheerleading
Debate
FFA
Thespian Society
Key Club
Musical
National Honor Society
Show Choir
Yearbook Staff

See also
List of high schools in Iowa

References

Public high schools in Iowa
Schools in Dickinson County, Iowa